Étoile Sportive de Métlaoui or ESM is a Tunisian football club, based in the city of Métlaoui in Tunisia. Founded in 1956, the team plays in red and yellow colors.

Honours 

Tunisian Ligue Professionnelle 2: 
Winners (1): 2013

Presidents
 Brahim Zammel (1956–61)
 Ali Soudani (1963–65)
 Habib Maamer (1965–66)
 Tahar Abbou (1966–67)
 Ali Boukhris (1967–70)
 Sadok Borgi (1970–72)
 Houcine Akrout (1972–74)
 Youssef Krifa (1974–76)
 Chérif Marrouki (1976–80)
 Boujelal Dinari (1980–82)
 Bouslah Abderrazak (1982–83)
 Boujelal Dinari (1990–92)
 Ezzedine Mâameri (1992–93)
 Boujelal Dinari  (1993–07)
 Salem Mestiri (2007–10)
 Boujelal Boussairi (2010–)

Managers

References

External links
Club logo

Football clubs in Tunisia
Association football clubs established in 1950
1950 establishments in Tunisia
Sports clubs in Tunisia